Kaipo Olsen-Baker (born 1 May 2002) is a New Zealand rugby union player.

Biography 
Olsen-Baker signed with Hurricanes Poua for the inaugural season of Super Rugby Aupiki. She was named in the Black Ferns squad for the 2022 Pacific Four Series. She scored a try on her international debut against the Wallaroos. She was yellow-carded in her second appearance for the Black Ferns against Canada.

Olsen-Baker was recalled into the team for the August test series against the Wallaroos for the Laurie O'Reilly Cup.

References

External link 

 Black Ferns Profile

2002 births
Living people
New Zealand female rugby union players
New Zealand women's international rugby union players
Rugby union players from Gisborne, New Zealand
Rugby union number eights